Henry Killigrew may refer to:

 Henry Killigrew (diplomat) (1528–1603), English diplomat and ambassador
 Henry Killigrew (playwright) (1613–1700), wrote Pallantus and Eudora
 Henry Killigrew (Royal Navy officer) (died 1712), Lord of Admiralty and son of the playwright